The Centre de mathématiques Laurent-Schwartz (CMLS) is a joint research unit (UMR 7640) of France's Centre national de la recherche scientifique (CNRS) and the École Polytechnique. It is located on the site of École Polytechnique in Palaiseau.

International reputation
According to an AERES report from December 2013, the CMLS is an excellent institute for fundamental mathematics with an abundant scientific output at the highest international level. Despite its small size, the CMLS is a prestigious institute in mathematics, with its tradition of excellence in fundamental research, its outstanding mathematicians, its international influence, the seminars it co-hosts, and its editorial activity.

History of the Center 
The École Polytechnique'''s first CNRS laboratory Laboratoire Leprince-Ringuet was created by Louis Leprince-Ringuet in 1936. Later, in 1958,  Louis Michel founded in Essonne the Centre de physique théorique (Center for Theoretical Physics) and invited Laurent Schwartz to initiate a similar project for mathematics. In 1965, General Ernest Mahieux (1910–1967), the school's commander, gave Schwartz approval for both the budget and the location.

The Mathematics Center was officially established on May 1, 1965, with a Scientific Council composed of Laurent Schwartz, Pierre Samuel, François Bruhat and Jean-Pierre Kahane, and actually began its activity in 1966. The Center has always remained very close to the Centre de physique théorique, sharing with it secretariat, library and materials.

Organization and activities of the unit
The unit is composed of three research teams: algebra and arithmetic; analysis and partial differential equations; and geometry and dynamics. The CMLS also actively participates in training through research: mathematical seminar days sponsored by the Union des Professeurs de classes préparatoires Scientifiques (UPS, Union of Science Preparatory Class Teachers) organized for teachers of preparatory classes, masters courses, and internship opportunities for the students of the École Polytechnique''.

Center Directors 
 1965–1983: Laurent Schwartz
 1983–1990: Michel Demazure
 1990–1994: Jean-Pierre Bourguignon
 1994–2000: François Laudenbach
 2000–2006: Claude Viterbo
 2006–2012: Yves Laszlo
 2012–2017: Yvan Martel
 Since 2017 : Charles Favre

References

1965 establishments in France
École Polytechnique
Research institutes in France
Education in France